Nathan Gold (December 8, 1663 – October 3, 1723), was an American colonial leader and deputy governor of the Colony of Connecticut from 1708 until his death in 1723.

Early life
Gold was the only son of Major Nathan and Sarah Phippen Gold and succeeded to the paternal estate in Fairfield, Connecticut.

Career
Gold served the Colony in various offices. He was a chief magistrate at Fairfield, Connecticut in 1677  He was Ensign of the Fairfield trainband in April, 1690 and Capt. in Oct., 1695. He was Deputy Governor from 1708 to 1723. He also served as Chief Justice of the Supreme Court in 1712.

Personal life
Gold married Hannah Talcott on October 29, 1650. She was the daughter of Major John and Helena Wakeman Talcott, who were early founders of Hartford, Connecticut. He and Hannah had six children, Abigail, John, Nathan, Samuel, Hezekiah, and Sarah. Hannah died on March 28, 1696. He married Sarah Burr Cook about 1698. He and Sarah had five children, Sarah, Onesimus, David, Martha, and Joseph. His wife, Sarah, died on October 17, 1711.

Gold died on October 3, 1723, and is interred at the Old Burying Ground, Fairfield, Fairfield County, Connecticut.

See also 
List of lieutenant governors of Connecticut
Jay Gould financier, descendant of Nathan Gold

References

External links

1663 births
1723 deaths
People of colonial Connecticut